A railway roundhouse is a building with a circular or semicircular shape used by railways for servicing and storing locomotives. Traditionally, though not always the case today, these buildings surrounded or were adjacent to a turntable.

Overview

Early steam locomotives normally traveled forwards only. Although reverse operations capabilities were soon built into locomotive mechanisms, the controls were normally optimized for forward travel, and the locomotives often could not operate as well in reverse. Some passenger cars, such as observation cars, were also designed as late as the 1960s for operations in a particular direction. Turntables allowed locomotives or other rolling stock to be turned around for the return journey, and roundhouses, designed to radiate around the turntables, were built to service and store these locomotives.

Most modern diesel and electric locomotives can run equally well in either direction, and many are push-pull trains with control cabs at each end. In addition, railroads often use multiple locomotives to pull trains, and even with locomotives that have distinct front and rear ends, the engines at opposing ends of a locomotive "consist" (a group of locomotives coupled together and controlled as a single unit) can be aligned so they face opposite directions. With such a setup, trains needing to reverse direction can use a technique known as a "run around," in which the engines are uncoupled from the train, pull around it on an adjacent track or siding, and reattach at the other end. The engineer changes operating ends from the original locomotive to the one on the opposite end of the locomotive consist.

Railroad terminals also use features such as balloon loops and wyes (Commonwealth: triangle) to reverse the orientation of railroad equipment. Because of the advent of these practices, modern roundhouses are frequently not round and are simply large buildings used for servicing locomotives. Like much other railroad terminology, however, the structure has retained its traditional name. The alternative term engine-house encompasses both semi-circular and rectangular structures and broadly describes all buildings intended for storage and servicing of locomotives. Shops or workshops are buildings containing hoists and heavy machinery capable of major repairs beyond routine servicing. Some roundhouses include shop facilities internally or in adjoining buildings.

Since the great dieselisation era of the 1940s and 1950s, many roundhouses have been demolished or put to other uses, but a few still stand and remain in use on the railroads. Early roundhouses were too small for later locomotives. The unusual shape of the buildings can make them difficult to adapt to new uses, but can also be aesthetically appealing.

Purpose
Roundhouses were originally constructed to service steam locomotives. In North America, regular daily serving began with a hostler moving an engine to an ash pit to remove the detritus of burned wood or coal. The locomotive's tender would be refilled with fuel, water, and sand, and the engine would be placed above an inspection pit so that workers could inspect it for any maintenance needs, like wear on its brake shoes and wheels. The engine's many moving parts would also be thoroughly lubricated, although this meant that engines typically required frequent cleanings to remove old lubricating fluid along with dirt and anything else that stuck.

At larger 24-hour North American roundhouses, steam locomotives would often be turned around and made ready for service within a few hours of arrival. However, locomotives with major issues or in need of semi-regular maintenance required additional time. Larger roundhouses were adequately staffed with boilermakers, blacksmiths, and pipefitters so that this work could be accomplished on-site; only the most extensive work, such as major unexpected repairs or scheduled major maintenance, required the transport of locomotives to specialized backshops.

History by country
The location of the first-ever roundhouse is thought to be Birmingham. England, built in 1837.

Australia

Canada
The London Roundhouse Project London, Ontario, Canada, is an extensive renovation of the Michigan Central Railroad steam locomotive repair shop which was built in 1887. It is to become the new home of Ellipsis Digital and Engine SevenFour, a pair of emerging technology companies.

The Canadian National Railways roundhouse at the Turcot Yard in Montreal, built in 1906, was the largest ever built in Canada.  Its demolition in 1962 to make way for the Turcot Interchange illustrated a profound change in transportation habits across North America.

The Steam Whistle Brewing brewery in Toronto, Ontario is located in the building known as the John Street Roundhouse, a former Canadian Pacific Railway steam locomotive repair facility.

The Canadian Pacific 374 steam engine is on display at the former CPR Drake Street Roundhouse in Vancouver, now the Roundhouse Community Centre. VIA Architecture was the architecture firm responsible for designing the station.

The Esquimalt and Nanaimo Railway Roundhouse in Victoria, British Columbia

France
Several roundhouses exist in France; four exist at Chambéry, built between 1906 and 1910. Another two exist at Avignon, with other roundhouses being at Bordeaux, Strasbourg, Dijon, Lyon, Paris, Marseille, Clermont-Ferrand, Mulhouse, Nevers, Toulon, Valence, and Saint Etienne.

Germany
Several roundhouses survive in Germany, The roundhouse at Augsburg is home to a museum.

Hungary
The former Budapest North Depot in Budapest is home to a railway museum since 2000.

Indonesia
At its height, there were four railway roundhouses in Indonesia. Three of them still survives in the present days: the roundhouse near Lempuyangan station in Yogyakarta, the one in Tebing Tinggi station in North Sumatera, and a former roundhouse inside Jatibarang sugar mill in Central Java which is now used as a mini railway museum.

Italy
2 roundhouses exist at Turin and are still in use by the FS.

New Zealand
There were 3 roundhouses in New Zealand. Elmer Lane in Greymouth was one of the largest and most famous roundhouses in New Zealand and had up to 17 total berths. the last remains were demolished in the 1990's. None of the original roundhouses survive however Mainline Steam as part of their Mercer project will build a roundhouse at Mercer.

North Korea
A roundhouse is known to exist at Manpo-Jian.

Japan

Roundhouses were a significant feature of Japanese railways. Many smaller roundhouses are still in use today as fully operational buildings on a few private and third-sector railways.

One Japanese roundhouse that remains intact is at the Kyoto Railway Museum. The museum comprises a number of structures classified by the Japanese Government as 'Important Cultural Properties'. One of these structures is the museum roundhouse, as it is the oldest reinforced-concrete car shed extant in Japan.

Poland

The museum roundhouse in Wolsztyn, in western Poland, continues to supply steam locomotives for regular national rail services (as of 2011).

Portugal
The Roundhouse at Entroncamento is home to the Portuguese National Railway Museum.

Switzerland
The Uster roundhouse in Uster.

Taiwan (ROC)
Changhua Roundhouse in Changhua City built in 1922 is the only surviving roundhouse in Taiwan and is still in use as of 2022.

United Kingdom

Probably the first railway roundhouse, designed by Robert Stephenson, was built in 1837 in Birmingham, at Curzon Street station. Its central turntable, inspection pits, and an exterior wall were uncovered in March 2020 during work to build HS2.

Another was built in 1839 at Derby, England by the North Midland Railway. A guidebook of the time says:

This roundhouse narrowly escaped demolition when the works closed down, and was classified as a listed building. It was restored in 2010, being converted into a brand new site for Derby College, with a new addition called the 'Stephenson Building' including the other survival of demolition - the original Midland Counties Railway workshop. The new site was opened in September 2009. Tours can be arranged through Derby Tourist Information Centre.

In Leeds, Thomas Grainger designed the roundhouse near Armley Gyratory that was opened in 1847, with accommodation for 20 trains from the Leeds & Thirsk Railway. It was operational until 1904. 

The Fenton, Murray and Jackson building in Leeds (1831–1843), a private workshop, may previously have been laid out in a radial pattern like a roundhouse.

The Roundhouse, Chalk Farm, London was built in 1847, but was too small for its function within 20 years (it is now an arts centre and concert venue).

Barrow Hill Engine Shed, which is home to a number of preserved locomotives is still in use.

United States

It is estimated that there were about 3,000 roundhouse sites in the United States, although at least three times that number were built between 1840 and 1950, since many were torn down and rebuilt as locomotives became increasingly larger. Although the United Kingdom was home to the earliest roundhouse (1837), the US was not far behind, with several being built around 1840 for the earliest railroads. It is likely that the first in the US was built by the Baltimore and Ohio at Mt. Clare (Baltimore), although this cannot be confirmed because early records have been lost. Early roundhouses, especially those built in cold climates, were fully enclosed with the turntable under cover as well as the stalls. Once locomotives became too large to fit in these structures, they were torn down and replaced with "donut" shaped structures that surrounded an open turntable. Although some roundhouses used by Class 1 railroads were built as a full-circle with as many as 52 stalls, the vast majority were only part of a circle with 12 or fewer stalls. 

Nearly every locomotive terminal in the country was anchored by a roundhouse, especially if a railroad owned more than a few locomotives. The largest concentration of roundhouses was in Chicago, with over 75 in and around the metropolitan region during the early 1900s. Other cities where multiple railroads terminated or were major division points also had over 20 roundhouses, such as Boston, Cleveland, St. Louis, Sioux City, Indianapolis, and Cincinnati. 

The largest "as-built" roundhouse ever constructed is believed to have been the Boston and Maine's East Sommerville roundhouse outside of Boston (today the site of the Boston Engine Terminal). However, several roundhouses were enlarged over time that eventually became larger than the one in Boston. For example, the Union Pacific roundhouse in Cheyenne, Wyoming was lengthened in 1930 to accommodate the new 4-8-8-4 "Big Boy" articulated locomotives being delivered. A portion of this roundhouse still stands and is used by Union Pacific to store heritage rolling stock.

The vast majority of roundhouses were torn down beginning in the 1950s as railroads converted motive power from steam to electric-diesel, which needed far less maintenance. Some were converted to service diesel engines, while others were used as storage or sold to other parties. Several dozen roundhouses stand today in active use by modern railroads and museums, although the majority of those still standing have been abandoned. An average of two per year are demolished or otherwise destroyed.

The only roundhouse still in use as a locomotive servicing facility by the same railroad that constructed it is the Long Island engine house in Queens, New York. The largest surviving roundhouse by interior square footage is owned and operated by the North Carolina Transportation Museum in Spencer, North Carolina. It was built by the Southern Railway in 1924 and contains 37 stalls.

The B&O Railroad Museum complex in Baltimore, Maryland contains the restored railcar maintenance roundhouse of the Baltimore and Ohio Railroad. Built in 1884, it is said to be the world's largest 22-sided building. 

The roundhouse in Aurora, Illinois, constructed in 1856, was purchased and restored by NFL football player Walter Payton. After Payton's death, the roundhouse was occupied by a micro-brewery and renamed Two Brothers Roundhouse, with a plaque mounted in Payton's honor. It is believed that this roundhouse is the oldest of its kind still standing in the United States.

Operational roundhouses

North America
The vast majority of roundhouses built in the US and Canada no longer exist, lie in ruins, or have been repurposed; however, a small number of them still exist and continue to operate in their intended capacity as locomotive storing and servicing facilities. Of the roughly 3,000 roundhouses that once existed in North America, fewer than 200 roundhouses are extant in the US ; in Canada, none exist east of Montreal. Below is a list of locations with operational roundhouses that are also open to the public.

Asia

See also

 Bahnbetriebswerk, a German motive power depot
 Bahnbetriebswerk (steam locomotives)
 List of railway roundhouses
 Motive power depot
 Railway turntable

References

Bibliography

External links

Barrow Hill, Derbyshire, England: includes a list of other worldwide roundhouses

 
Round buildings